Leporinus microphysus is a species of Leporinus is found in the Amazon in Brazil in South America.

Etymology
It is named micro- meaning small; physus, the bladder, referring to the fish's small gas bladder.

References

Taxa named by José Luis Olivan Birindelli
Taxa named by Heraldo Antonio Britski
Taxa described in 2013
Fish described in 2013
Anostomidae